Let's Just Stay Here is an album by Canadian alternative country artists Carolyn Mark and NQ Arbuckle, released October 13, 2009 on Mint Records.

The album was a nominee for Roots & Traditional Album of the Year – Group at the 2010 Juno Awards.

Personnel
The album features guest appearances by Corb Lund, Miranda Mulholland and Jenny Whiteley.

Track listing

References

2009 albums
NQ Arbuckle albums
Carolyn Mark albums
Mint Records albums